Novoseltsev is a Russian masculine surname, its feminine counterpart is Novoseltseva. It may refer to
Anatoly Novoseltsev (1933–1995), Russian orientalist
Ivan Novoseltsev (born 1979), Russian ice hockey player
Ivan Yevgenyevich Novoseltsev (born 1991), Russian football player
Larisa Novoseltseva, Russian singer-songwriter and composer
Ruslan Novoseltsev (born 1974), Russian figure skater
Yuri Novoseltsev (born 1964), Russian football player

Russian-language surnames